Wolfgang Sigl (born 23 December 1972 in Linz) is an Austrian rower. He finished fifth in the men's lightweight double sculls at the 1996 Summer Olympics. Both his mother (Renate Sigl  Sika) and grandmother (Eva Sika) were multiple medallists at European Rowing Championships in single sculls. His grandmother won five silver and two bronze medals, and his mother won two bronze medals.

References

External links
 

1972 births
Living people
Rowers from Linz
Austrian male rowers
Olympic rowers of Austria
Rowers at the 1996 Summer Olympics
Rowers at the 2000 Summer Olympics
Rowers at the 2004 Summer Olympics
World Rowing Championships medalists for Austria